Oress-Krobou (also spelled Orès-Krobou) is a town in southeastern Ivory Coast. It is a sub-prefecture of Agboville Department in Agnéby-Tiassa Region, Lagunes District.

Oress-Krobou was a commune until March 2012, when it became one of 1126 communes nationwide that were abolished.

In 2014, the population of the sub-prefecture of Oress-Krobou was 5,806.

Village
The sub-prefecture is only composed of the village of Oress-Krobou.

References

Sub-prefectures of Agnéby-Tiassa
Former communes of Ivory Coast